ATJ 220SV is a small turbojet, used to power model aircraft.

Specifications

References

Microjet engines